is a 2016 Japanese drama film directed by Takashi Yamazaki. It is based on the 2012 novel of same name (in Japanese) by Naoki Hyakuta. It was released in Japan on December 10, 2016.

Plot

Cast
Junichi Okada as Tetsuzō Kunioka (based on Sazō Idemitsu)
Hidetaka Yoshioka as Tadashi Shinonome
Shōta Sometani as Yoshio Hasebe
Ryohei Suzuki as Kōtarō Takechi
Tōru Nomaguchi as Kōichi Kashiwai
Pierre Taki as Sōhei Fujimoto
Haru Kuroki as Hatsumi Ogawa
Ken Mitsuishi as Makio Kunioka
Haruka Ayase as Yuki Kunioka, Tetsuzō's wife
Shinichi Tsutsumi as Tatsurō Morita
Masaomi Kondō (special appearance) as Shōtarō Kida
Jun Kunimura as Takumi Torikawa
Kaoru Kobayashi as Jisaku Kōga
Kenichi Yajima
Kisuke Iida
Kunihiro Suda
Kazuyuki Asano
Takashi Kobayashi
Ian Moore
Rakuto Tochihara

Awards

References

External links 
 
 

2016 films
2010s Japanese-language films
Films directed by Takashi Yamazaki
Films based on Japanese novels
Toho films
Films scored by Naoki Satō
2010s Japanese films